Olcay Turhan (born 30 January 1988) is a German footballer who plays for Arminia Bielefeld. He made his debut for the club in the final game of the 2011–12 3. Fußball-Liga season against Werder Bremen II.

References

External links

1988 births
Living people
German people of Turkish descent
German footballers
Fortuna Düsseldorf players
Arminia Bielefeld players
3. Liga players
Sportspeople from Münster
Association football midfielders
Footballers from North Rhine-Westphalia
SV Lippstadt 08 players